An election for the Castle Morpeth Borough Council was held on 4 May 1995.  The Labour Party won the most seats, although the council stayed under no overall control. The whole council was up for election, and turnout was 47.4%.

Election result

See also 
Castle Morpeth Borough Council elections

References 

District council elections in England
Council elections in Northumberland